Conus planiliratus is an extinct species of sea snail, a marine gastropod mollusk in the family Conidae, the cone snails, cone shells or cones.

This species is not to be confounded with Conus planiliratus Sowerby, G.B. III, 1870, a synonym of Graphiconus inscriptus inscriptus maculospira (Pilsbry, H.A. & C.W. Johnson, 1922), itself a synonym of Conus inscriptus Reeve, 1843.

Description
The size of the shell varies between 19 mm and 24 mm.

Distribution
This species is only known as a fossil from the Neogene of the Dominican Republic.

References

 Hendricks J.R. (2015). Glowing seashells: diversity of fossilized coloration patterns on coral reef-associated cone snail (Gastropoda: Conidae) shells from the Neogene of the Dominican Republic. PLoS ONE. 10(4): e0120924

External links
 World Register of Marine Species

planiliratus
Gastropods described in 1850
Taxa named by George Brettingham Sowerby I